Scott Ferrier (born 12 June 1974 in Melbourne, Victoria) is a former decathlete from Australia, who represented his native country at two consecutive Summer Olympics, starting in 1996. An alumnus of Trinity Grammar School, Ferrier competed for the Old Melburnians Athletics club and was a two-time Australian champion in the men's decathlon, he married Olympic teammate and high jumper Alison Inverarity in 2000.

Achievements

References

External links
Scott Ferrier at Australian Athletics Historical Results
 
 
 
 
 

1974 births
Living people
Australian decathletes
Athletes (track and field) at the 1996 Summer Olympics
Athletes (track and field) at the 2000 Summer Olympics
Athletes (track and field) at the 1998 Commonwealth Games
Olympic athletes of Australia
Athletes from Melbourne
People educated at Trinity Grammar School, Kew
Commonwealth Games medallists in athletics
Commonwealth Games silver medallists for Australia
Medallists at the 1998 Commonwealth Games